The R570 is a Regional Route in South Africa.

Route
Its northern origin is the Malelane gate of the Kruger National Park. From there it head south, crossing the N4. It continues south-east, before veering south-west and reaching Jeppe's Reef Border Post, where after it enters Eswatini as the MR1.

References

Regional Routes in Mpumalanga